Sherman's March is a 2007 American Civil War television docudrama film first aired on the History Channel, which describes the titular March to the Sea of the Union Army led by William Tecumseh Sherman, and the ensuing Campaign of the Carolinas which ended the war. The film was directed by Rick King and narrated by Edward Herrmann. Sherman's campaign became the mythic symbol of the Civil War's destruction; the film's opening sequence poses the question "Sherman: Terrorist or Savior?".

Synopsis
The documentary chronicles General William Tecumseh Sherman's historic "March to the Sea" through Georgia, South Carolina and North Carolina during the fall of 1864. It shows Sherman marching 62,000 Union troops over 650 miles in less than 100 days, and losing only 600 men along the way. The march introduces a new concept to the already brutal Civil War: total war, where the distinctions between combatants and civilians is blurred. While hated by white Southerners as a destroyer, Sherman is hailed by black Southerners as a liberator. It ends with Union victory and closes with Sherman as an old man living in New York and fondly remembering how his "nephews" and their "uncle Billy" would make ten miles a day.

The documentary utilizes state of the art production techniques including CGI, special effects and historical re-creations. It relies on historical reenactors to play Sherman's soldiers and all dialogue is in fact quotes from historical sources: letters, Sherman's memoirs, diaries, etc. The documentary features a psychological profile on Sherman, stating that in the months leading up to the Civil War he was accused of being insane and that he contemplated suicide.

Bill Oberst, the actor playing Sherman, states in a behind-the-scenes featurette that while the general will always be a controversial figure, he hopes that the documentary will shed light on why the man did what he did. It emphasizes that Sherman was loved by the enslaved blacks whom he freed and that while he did not see himself as fighting to destroy slavery, he nevertheless made a point of treating blacks whom he met with courtesy and respect. (The documentary also shows the reactions of his soldiers as they met blacks along the March. Many had never seen a black person and were surprised to learn that blacks were ordinary people.) The documentary also mentions that Sherman killed far fewer Confederate soldiers and civilians than did Ulysses S. Grant, his friend and fellow general, yet Sherman was the one vilified. The scholars interviewed postulate that the South had need for a scapegoat in the wake of the Civil War and that Sherman was the easiest target. For his part, Sherman is stated to have seen himself as only doing his duty and that he did not care what people said about him one way or the other.

Cast
 Bill Oberst Jr. as General William Tecumseh Sherman
 Jared Morrison as Major Henry Hitchcock
 Chris Clawson as Theodore Upson
 Mike Brown as General Oliver O. Howard
 Allen Brenner as Brigadier General Jefferson C. Davis
 Harry Bulkeley as General Ulysses S. Grant
 Shaun C. Grenan as Confederate Officer, Union soldier
 Robert A. Guadagnino as soldier
 Lucas N. Hall as 1st Lieutenant C.S.A.
 Russell Haynes as soldier
 Marc A. Hermann as Sherman's bummer, US Artillerist, CS Soldier
 Eric U. Lowman as executioner, Western Zouave
 Todd McCall as General Sherman's Staff Officer
 Joan Moses as Dolly Burge
 Gavin Peretti as hanged man
 Norman J. Pfizenmayer III as soldier
 A.J. Roberts as General Judson Kilpatrick
 Jeffrey F. Smith as General Joseph E. Johnston
 Timothy Smith as Union soldier
 Keith E. Whitehead as Griswoldville soldier
 Brad Wyand as soldier

Other cast
 Guy W. Gane III as Major Rhoads
 Bob Waters as leader of escaping slaves, Ebenezer Creek
 Scott E. Zeiss as Chaplain John Height
 Victoria Cooper as Emma LeConte

History consultants
 John F. Marszalek - Historian, Mississippi State University
 Stephen Davis - Civil War historian
 Gordon Jones - Military historian, Atlanta History Center

Background
Filming took place on location in High Definition in Washington County, Maryland and also at Endview Plantation and Lee Hall in Newport News, Virginia and in Gettysburg, Pennsylvania.

Critical reception
The documentary was well received by television critics. Tony Perry of the Los Angeles Times wrote, "Civil War documentaries are inevitably judged against the monumental work The Civil War by Ken Burns. Sherman's March, different in tone and approach, more than holds its own. Whereas Burns used period photographs and regional music, Sherman's March leans on reenactments, maps and, like Burns, academic talking heads. If there is a quibble, it's that the music tends to distract, not enhance, the effect."

Broadcasting critic Dusty Saunders wrote of the scholarly aspects of the documentary, "...Sherman's March, [is] a compelling documentary on The History Channel that's must viewing for Civil War buffs. Even viewers with only passing knowledge about this military action will be mesmerized by this superb recounting."

Brian Lowry, critic for Variety magazine, on the program's historical presentation: "... this tightly produced documentary provides a welcome primer on the military genius of William Tecumseh Sherman, whose famous march through the South remains a subject of controversy...this doc is among the better recent History Channel productions."

See also
 Sherman's March to the Sea

References

External links
 

2007 television films
2007 films
Sherman's March to the Sea
Documentary films about the American Civil War
American documentary television films
History (American TV channel) original programming
American independent films
Cultural depictions of Ulysses S. Grant
Cultural depictions of Robert E. Lee
2000s English-language films
Films directed by Rick King
2000s American films